Ye Shengtao (28 October 1894 – 16 February 1988) was a Chinese writer, journalist, educator, publisher and politician. He was a founder of the Association for Literary Studies, the first literature association during the May Fourth Movement in China. He served as the Vice-Minister of Culture of the People's Republic of China.

Throughout his life, he was dedicated to publishing and language education. He subscribed to the philosophy that "Literature is for Life".

Biography

Early life 
Ye was born on 28 October 1894 in Wu County, Jiangsu province. His name at birth was Ye Shaojun, and his courtesy name was Bingchen. His father worked as a bookkeeper for a landlord and they lived a very modest life. When he was six years old, he entered a mediocre school for primary study. He often followed his father to work. He travelled around the city and experienced the lives of the poor.

In 1907, Ye entered Caoqiao Secondary School.  After his graduation, he worked as a primary school teacher, before being dismissed by the school in 1914. Finding himself unemployed, he devoted himself entirely to writing classical Chinese novels, which were published in "Libailiu Magazine" (《禮拜六》 "Saturday Magazine"), until he found work as the Chinese teacher of a school set up by the Shanghai Commercial Press. At the same time, he became the editor of primary textbooks of the Shanghai Commercial Press in 1915.

Ye had been living in an era of instability, including the 1894 Sino-Japanese War, the Hundred Days' Reform, and later the Sphere of Influence. His early life experiences affected his sense of nationalism and contributed to his later career as a journalist and an educator.

Career in literary movement 
Throughout his life, Ye worked a lot for literary movement. Under the influences of the May Fourth Movement in 1919 commonly known as the New Culture Movement, Ye indulged himself in his literary career. He participated in a student organization called 'Xinchao She' ("New Tide Society" 新潮社 1919-1920) of Peking University, and started publishing fictions, poems, prose, literary criticism and scripts of drama etc. Ye was also an editor in PuShe (樸社, 1923). In 1921, Ye, Mao Dun and Zheng Zhenduo founded the earliest literary society of the New Literature Movement, the "Wenxue Yanjiu Hui", (文學研究會 "Association for Literary Studies"), advocating realism art but rejecting the principle  "Art is for Art's Sake". In 1936, Ye, Mao Dun and Hong Shen established the "Chinese Literature and Art Society" (Zhongguo Wenyi jia Xiehui 中國文藝家協會). In 1941, he became an editorial committee of the "Teaching for Literature and History"" (Wenshi Jiaoxue 文史教學). Ye was one of the establishers of the "Literary Alliance for Anti-Japanese Imperialism".

Political life 
Ye was responsible for a number of posts in the authority. Following the Communist Revolution, Ye served as the Vice-director of General Administration of Press and Publication, the President of People Education Publication, and the Vice-Minister of Education. He was also elected as the Committee of the Fifth Standing Committee of the National People's Congress, the National Committee of The Fifth Chinese People's Political Consultative Conference (CPPCC), and the Chairman of China Association for Promoting Democracy.

Ye died in Beijing on 16 February 1988 at the age of 94.

Educational and journalistic ideologies 
For Ye, education and journalism were inseparable.

The goal of education is not to educate" (「教是為了不教」)
Ye had a great impact on improving the Modern Chinese language education. He brought a new idea to the Chinese educators, i.e. students should be taught the methods of learning, instead of the long and detailed content in books. This idea was a breakthrough in traditional Chinese education, which used to rely heavily on memorization and indoctrination. Also, Ye promoted critical thinking and the importance of personal value judgment. He suggested that these learning skills should be built within the students and were the basis for students' lifelong learning.

Literature is for life (文學為人生) 
Ye was passionate in reflecting the real life in his works:

Most of his journalistic works were inspired by people's lives. He believed that literature was not only for leisure, but also a tool to reveal life and stimulate readers to contemplate the reality.  He felt obliged to let the reader know what was actually happening around. This was one of the reasons why he wanted to combine literature with journalism. He thought that literary works should also be used to arouse youngsters' awareness and responsiveness towards society . This ideology resembles the journalistic principle of telling the truth. Ye was also a reporter of life.

Readability (易讀性) 
Readability was a prominent characteristic in Ye's works. It means how efficient a reader can perceive and understand a passage. As a journalist, Ye put great emphasis on the use of language. This might be because he had been a teacher for more than 10 years before he became an editor. He thought that writings were for the reader and he considered  writing as a means of communication between readers and authors. A major problem of the writers at that period was that they were not equipped with good writing skills. Their wordings were inaccurate and vague in meaning. Very often, only well educated people could appreciate their works. The writers neglected the importance of practicability. Hence, literature was not promoted to the general public. Ye thought that one could only write something  artistic if one could write something practical and understandable. It would be useless if the readers could not even understand the content.

Life as a journalist

"My first career, I would say, is editor." 
"If anybody asks about my career, I would say, my first career is editor, second is teacher," Ye said. 
Ye had spent much of his life on editing and publishing. The Shanghai Commercial Press was the starting point of Ye's editorship.
He became the editor of the press since 1923.

By the end of 1930, Ye quit the post in the Shanghai Commercial Press and became the editor of Kaiming Press (Kaiming Shu Dian 開明書店). He started to edit books on Chinese language and storybooks for children.

"Editing is no easy task." To Ye, being an editor was never simply a job, but a career. "Recklessness is strictly forbidden in editing, you have to check everything in person.  Editors must be earnest to their publications, their reporters, and their readers." Editor plays an important role in monitoring the final outcome. Ye suggested that "seriousness" is the key of being a successful editor. He had always upheld this attitude in his works.

Ye devoted himself to editing and publishing for his whole life . His enthusiasm on his "first and ultimate" career had never stopped . During the Second Sino-Japanese War, Ye moved to Leshan with his family and worked as a professor at the Department of Chinese at Wuhan University . In 1946, he returned to Shanghai and resumed his editorship at Kaiming Press.

Ye's publications 
In his entire life, Ye was very much involved in the field of journalism. From 1925 to 1929 was Ye's new era of publications. He edited many famous magazines and newspapers, below are some of his works:

New era for modern publishing 
Ye's vision in modern Chinese language catalyzed the development of modern journalism in China.

Ye was eager to advocate the standardization of modern Chinese language including the standardization of grammar, rhetoric, vocabulary, punctuation, simplified character, and the elimination of variant characters. He also compiled and standardized the Chinese character for publishing and formulated the Chinese Phoneticization Scheme (Hanyu Pinyin Fang'an  《漢語拼音方案》). All his efforts helped to improve the quality and organization of editorial work.

Most importantly, Ye promoted vernacular Chinese in publishing.  His magazines and newspapers were mostly published in vernacular style, which greatly facilitated other journalists and readers to read. All these contributed to the rapid development of modern journalism in China.

Ye was an excellent educator and talent scout, too. He educated and discovered many outstanding young authors and editors like Ba Jin, Ding Ling, and Dai Wangshu.

The establishment of The Truth Daily

Background of the May Thirtieth Movement 
On 30 May 1925, a bloody massacre took place in Shanghai, known as May Thirtieth Movement (五卅運動 Wǔsà- yùndòng). About 2000 Shanghai workers and students ushered in a vigorous anti-imperialist movement, protesting imperialist domination and demanding to abolish the unfair treaties. The demonstrators thundered "Down with the imperialists!". Workers throughout China responded with a general strike and mass demonstrations. British police then suppressed the demonstrators with violence and killed 12 Chinese in the event. Till 1 June, more than 20 Chinese were killed.

"Who will tell the truth?" 
None of the Shanghai newspapers reported this tragedy .The front-page news were mainly the gossip of the players of Chinese opera. The Shanghai newspapers refused to mention this incident because of political pressure. As a journalist, Ye denounced "Why are the journalists so hardhearted to ignore this shocking massacre? Why are they so afraid of the fact? It's ridiculous that nobody would tell the truth." Ye thus founded Gōnglǐ Rìbào (The Truth Daily 《公理日報》) with Zheng Zhenduo and Hu Yuzhi (胡愈之1896－1986), aimed to reveal the whole picture of this tragedy regardless of the imperialist power, in order to arouse the awareness and nationalism of the general public and also to promote "the spirit of May 30th movement" across China.

A new way to journalism
In addition to reporting the truth, The Truth Daily 《公理日报》provided a forum for public discussion, called "Shèhuì Cáipànsuǒ" ("Tribunal of the Society"〈社會裁判所〉), which encouraged reader to express their viewpoints towards the society. Ye and other editors of The Truth Daily severely criticized the unfairness of the society. This newspaper served as a watchdog over the despotic power, and initiated the concept of "freedom of press" in the early 
modern Chinese society.

Due to financial difficulties and disagreement among the editors, The Truth Daily finally terminated after running for 22 days. Yet Ye has never stopped pursuing the truth. After the Second Sino-Japanese War (1937–1945), he participated in the struggle against Nationalist government, striving for democracy and the freedom of press.

 Contribution to literature 

Realism: the mirror of life
Realism became the most sustainable hallmark of Ye Shengtao.
Ye was one of the pioneers in realistic writing. His writing was like a mirror, reflecting the rotten side of society and human traits.

Being an educator, Ye had many narrations on intellectuals in his works. Many of the protagonists in Ye's works were the exploited, the disabled and the prosecuted who were in lower social class. Ye had worked consistently on reflecting the truth and reality in his works. His highly praised fiction "Ni Huanzhi" 《倪煥之 》 revealed the pathetic life of an intellectual called "Ni Huanzhi".

Ye discovered that many people in the New China were selfish, apathetic, hypocritic and conservative. People gave up their values in exchange for a stable life. Ye's works shared a sense of irony. He expressed his discontent in a bid to arouse the awareness of the public towards these social weaknesses. Ye was not only writing stories, but also reporting the fallacies in society. His writings were not only for leisure but feeding the rest by knowing and reflecting the reality, "...the basic requirement for writing fiction is a pair of penetrating and observat eyes and my eyes are not penetrating enough...Of course, it is not necessary to train one's eyes just for the sake of writing but trained eyes do, in reality, nourish life." (Ye Shengtao, 'Guoqu Suitan', op. cit., p. 46.)

Children's literature: A mind training for the young
Ye's first academic essay was about children literature, called Children's Concept', criticizing how feudalism affected children's lives in China.

In fact, Ye was the first writer who created fairy tales in the 1920s. His writing "A Scarecrow"(Dào cǎo rén  《稻草人》) was published in 1923. This children's reading was very popular among numerous youngsters. Another 'fairy tale was "A Stone Figure of an Ancient Hero". (Gǔdāi yīngxióng de shíxiàng 《古代英雄的石像》) This story was about a stone which had been sculptured into a hero statue. The message behind this easy-to-read story was to ridicule the authorities who were arrogant and insensitive to his people.

Ye's student, Ding Ling, once praised that his fairy tales were able to induce readers to think more about the society. Ye's fairy tales were simple, yet, with deep meaning inside it. He believed that children should have an understanding of their surrounding so as to enhance their critical power. Through Ye's stories, children could gradually acquire a clearer picture of society and their relationships with it.

 Language and rhetoric
Ye's language was refined and eloquent, and was known for his ability to choose just the right words to express himself. Ye emphasized the importance of feeling and emotion throughout his journals. Characters in Ye's work were vivid and he deeply penetrated into and shared their inner feelings. The popular writer Zhao Jingshen held that Ye was a special figure in the field of literature, describing him transcendent and extraordinary. The beauty of his works lasted despite any conditions. The expression of emotions and feelings were built on the basis of truth and reality that made his stories full of power. "Emotion seems like the shining light, while description and assessment are spotted by this light," Ye said. This speech somehow showed that Ye was not only a story teller, but a great artist.

 Influx of foreign elements
Ye's realistic writing style became the role model for many other writers. He also admitted that reading different western pieces did help him a lot on his writing, "If I hadn't read English, if I had not got in touch with literature in English, I wouldn't have written novels." His works were retrospective, thoughtful and critical. They were not only based on feeling, but on actual and objective observations. Ye was not only a writer, but also a reporter. These insights became the rich ingredients in his works. He shaped a new dimension to Chinese modern literature.

 Ye's works  

Literature

"The Snowing Morning"  Xuě zhāo 《雪朝》 (co-written with Zhu Ziqing etc.)   (Poems)          1922
"A scarecrow" Dào cǎo rén  《稻草人》 (Novel)   1923
"Under the horizon"  Xiàn xià 《線下》    (Short stories)  1925
"Ní Huànzhī (the name of the character)" 《倪煥之 》   (Novel)  1929
"A Stone Figure of an Ancient Hero"  Gǔ dài yīng xióng de shí xiàng. 《古代英雄的石像》   (Fairy-tales)     1931 .
"The Heart of Literature" Wén xīn 《文心》  (Educational)  1934 (co-written with Xia Mianzun 夏丏尊)
An Exercise in Weiyanju"  Wèi yàn jū xí zuò 《未厭居習作》          ( Prose)           1935
"The Collections of Ye Shengtao's Short Stories" Shèngtáo duǎn piān xiǎo shuō jí 《聖陶短篇小說集》 (Short Stories collections))     1936
"Selected Collections of Ye Shengtao"  Yè Shàojūn xuǎn jí 《葉紹鈞選集》 (Collectanea) 1936
"A Guide to Skimming" Luè dú zhǐ dǎo jǔ yù 《略讀指導舉隅》1946, (co-written with Zhu Ziqing)
"The Study of Fairy Tales"  értóng Wénxué Yánjiū 《兒童文學研究》1947
"A Guide to Intensive Reading" Jīng dú zhǐ dǎo jǔ yù 《精讀指導舉隅》 1948
"Recordings of Writing" Xiě zuò zá tán 《寫作雜談》 1951
"Selected fairy-tales of Ye" Yè Shèngtáo tónghuà xuǎn 《葉聖陶童話選》 (Fairy-Tale) 1956
"Ye Shengtao's Collectanea" Yè Shèngtáo chūbǎn wénjí.《葉聖陶出版文集》1958
"Resistance" Kàng zhēng 《抗爭》 (Short  stories)     1959
"The Night" Yè 《 夜》         1959
"An ordinary story"《Píng cháng de gù shì 《平常的故事》 1959
 "Light wave" Wēi bō 《微波》 1959
"The Collection of Poems" Qiè cún jí 《篋存集 》                   (Poems)             1960
"Mr Pan Weathered the Storm" Pān xiān shēng zài nàn zhōng 《潘先生在難中》 (Short Stories) 1964
"Ye Shengtao's Proses" Yè Shèngtáo Sǎnwén 《葉聖陶散文》 (Proses) 1983
"I & Sichuan" Wǒ yǔ Sìchuān 《我與四川》    (proses & poems)    1984
"The Speaking of Literary works" Wén zhāng jiǎnghuà 《文章講話》 (co-written with Xia Mianzun 夏丏尊)  (Educational)  1997
"72 Topics about Literature" Wén huà qī shí èr jiǎng 《文話七十二講》   (Educational)      1999, (co-written with Xia Mianzun 夏丏尊)

Journalism
"Saturday Magazine"  Lǐbàiliù Magazine《禮拜六》
"Shanghai News of Current Affairs"  Shànghǎi Shíshì　Xīnbào《上海時事新報》
"Shanghai Nationalists' Daily"  Shànghǎi Mínguó Rìbào 《上海民國日報》
"The Literature Weekly"  Wénxué Zhōubào 《文學周報》
"The Truth Daily"  Gōnglǐ Rìbào 《公理日報》
"The Chinese Language and Literature Monthly"  Guówén Yuèkān《國文月刊》
"Suzhou Commentary"  Sūzhōu Pínglùn 《蘇州評論》
"Women's Magazine"  Fùnǚ Zázhì 《婦女雜誌》
"Novel Monthly"  Xiǎoshuō Yuèbào 《小說月報》
"High School Students" Zhōngxuéshēng 《中學生》
"Enlightened Youth"  Kāimíng Shàonián 《開明少年》
"Chinese Authors"  Zhōngguó Zuòjiā 《中國作家》
"People's Education"  Rénmín Jiàoyù 《人民教育》
"Chinese Language" Zhōngguó Yǚwén 《中國語文》
"Poems" Shī  《詩》
"The Light" Guangming 《光明》
"Chinese Language Magazine"  Guowen Zazhi
"Magazine for High School Students in the War".  Zhongxuesheng Zhanshi Banyue kan

Ye Shengtao Memorial Hall

Ye Shengtao Memorial Hall is located at the former site of The 5th High School where Ye Shengtao taught from 1917 to 1922. It is located beside the Baosheng Temple in Luzhi township, Wuzhong district of Suzhou city.

Further reading
Chen Liao. Ye Shengtao ping zhuan (Biography of Ye Shengtao). Tianjin: Bai hua Press,1981 陳遼: 《葉聖陶評傳》，天津: 百花出版社，1981
Chen, Lian. Ye Shengtao zhuan ji (A biography of Ye Shengtao) Nanjing: Jiangsu jiaoyu chu ban she, 1986. 陳遼《葉聖陶傳記》南京︰江蘇教育出版社，1986
Gu, Yeping; Chen, jie. Ye Shengtao Taipei: Hai feng, Min 80 [1991]. 辜也平 陳捷 《葉聖陶》台北:海風 民80 [1991]。 [1991]。 
Liu Zengren, Feng Guanglian. Ye Shengtao yan jiu zi liao (The Study of Ye Shengtao). Beijing : Beijing Shiyue Wenyi Press, 1988 劉增人 馮光廉: 《葉聖陶研究資料》，北京: 北京:十月文藝出版社， 1988. 
Liu, Zengren. Shan gao shui chang: Ye Shengtao zhuan (A biography of Ye Shengtao) Taipei: Ye qiang chu ban she, 1994.  劉增人 《山高水長:葉聖陶傳》台北:業強出版社，1994。 
PangYang. Ye Shengtao he ta de jia ren (Ye Shengtao and his family). Shenyang : Chun Feng Wenyi  Press, 1983. 龐暘:《葉聖陶和他的家人》瀋陽:春風文藝出版社， 2001  
Selis, David Joel. Yeh Shao-chün : a critical study of his fiction, Ann Arbor, Mich. : University of Microfilms International, 1981.
Ye, Shengtao. Ye Shengtao'' Hong Kong: San lian shu dian xianggang fen dian, 1983. 《葉聖陶》葉聖陶 香港:三聯書店香港分店1983。

Portrait 
    Ye Shengtao. A Portrait by Kong Kai Ming at Portrait Gallery of Chinese Writers (Hong Kong Baptist University Library).

External links
 Ye Shengtao Research Association of China (Chinese)
 Ye Shengtao's Publication (Chinese)
 Ye Shengtao and Ni Huanzhi (Chinese)
 The Celebrities and Commercial Press
 In Memory of Mr.Ye Shengtao (Chinese)
 Ye Shengtao and the People's Education Press
 Ye Shengtao: Chairman of Central Committee of China Association for Promoting Democracy

1894 births
1988 deaths
20th-century Chinese male writers
20th-century Chinese short story writers
20th-century novelists
Chinese children's writers
Chinese male novelists
Chinese male short story writers
Chinese publishers (people)
Chinese schoolteachers
Educators from Suzhou
Vice Chairpersons of the National Committee of the Chinese People's Political Consultative Conference
People's Republic of China politicians from Jiangsu
People's Republic of China short story writers
Politicians from Suzhou
Members of the China Association for Promoting Democracy
Republic of China journalists
Republic of China novelists
Republic of China short story writers
Short story writers from Jiangsu
Writers from Suzhou
National Wuhan University alumni
Burials at Babaoshan Revolutionary Cemetery